is a Japanese motorcycle racer who currently competes for the Honda Team Asia in the Moto3 World Championship. He previously competed in the Asia Talent Cup, having won that championship in 2021.

Career

Asia Talent Cup

Races by year
(key) (Races in bold indicate pole position; races in italics indicate fastest lap)

Grand Prix motorcycle racing

By season

By class

Races by year
(key) (Races in bold indicate pole position; races in italics indicate fastest lap)

References

External links

2005 births
Living people
Japanese motorcycle racers
21st-century Japanese people